The 2011 AFL season was the Gold Coast Suns' first season in the Australian Football League (AFL). The Gold Coast Suns reserves team also competed in the inaugural NEAFL season.

Draft picks

Transactions

Overview

Trades

Free Agents

Additions

2011 playing list

Pre-season results

NAB Cup

Home and Away season

Results Summary

Home and Away games

Ladder

Ladder Progress

Awards

Brownlow Medal

Gold Coast Club Champion

Other Awards

Representative honours

International Rules

Australia

NEAFL season

Results

Ladder

References

External links 
 2011 NAB Cup Fixture
 2011 AFL Fixture

Gold Coast Suns
Gold Coast Suns seasons